A class or A-class may refer to:

Locomotives 
 CIÉ A class or CIE 001 Class, a 1955 class of Co-Co diesel locomotives used by Córas Iompair Éireann (The Irish Transport Company)
 NZR A class (1873), a class of steam tank locomotives operated by the New Zealand Railways Department
 NZR A class (1906), a class of steam tender locomotives operated by the New Zealand Railways Department
 V/Line A class, a class of diesel locomotives that operates in Victoria, Australia
 Victorian Railways NA class, a class of narrow-gauge (hence "N") steam tank locomotives
 WAGR A class (diesel), locomotives of the Western Australian Government Railways

Trams
 A-class Melbourne tram, a single-unit bogie tram that operates in Melbourne, Australia

Ships
 A-class destroyer (1913), heterogeneous group of British torpedo boat destroyers built in the mid-1890s
 A-class destroyer (1929), British destroyers of World War II
 A-class torpedo boat, German torpedo boats of World War I
 A-class submarine (disambiguation), several classes of submarines
 A-class minehunter, ships of the Turkish Navy

Other uses
 A Class (album), studio album by South Korean girl group miss A
 A-segment, a European vehicle size class
 Mercedes-Benz A-Class, a range of subcompact hatchbacks and sedans
 A class (schools), system of categorizing school for sport competitions

See also 
 Class A (disambiguation)
 A type (disambiguation)
 A series (disambiguation)
 Class (disambiguation)